The 2015–16 Minnesota Golden Gophers men's basketball team represented the University of Minnesota in the 2015–16 NCAA Division I men's basketball season. Led by third year head coach Richard Pitino, the Golden Gophers were members of the Big Ten Conference and played their home games at Williams Arena in Minneapolis, Minnesota. They finished the season 8–23, 2–16 in Big Ten play to finish in 13th place. They lost in the first round of the Big Ten tournament to Illinois.

The season was marred by the suspensions of three players, Kevin Dorsey, Nate Mason and Dupree McBrayer, on March 1, 2016 for allegedly posting a sex video online. The players were suspended for the rest of the season.

Previous season
The Golden Gophers finished the 2014–15 Season with a record of 18–15, 6–12 in Big Ten play to finish in a tie for 10th place. They won their first round game in the Big Ten tournament against Rutgers, but they lost their second round game to Ohio State.

Departures

Incoming transfers

Incoming recruits

2016 Recruiting Class

Roster

Schedule and results

|-
! colspan="9" style="background:#; color:#;"|Exhibition

|-
! colspan="9" style="background:#; color:#;"|Non-conference regular season

|-
! colspan="9" style="background:#;|Big Ten regular season

|-
! colspan="9" style="background:#;|Big Ten tournament

See also
 2015–16 Minnesota Golden Gophers women's basketball team

References

2015-16 team
2015–16 Big Ten Conference men's basketball season
2015 in sports in Minnesota
2016 in sports in Minnesota